Gnoma suturalis is a species of beetle in the family Cerambycidae. It was described by John O. Westwood in 1832. It is known from Australia and the Philippines.

References

Lamiini
Beetles described in 1832